Leonid Vladimirovich Kiyenko (born 10 June 1974) is a Russian football manager and a former player.

References

1974 births
Living people
Soviet footballers
Russian footballers
FC Okean Nakhodka players
Russian Premier League players
FC SKA-Khabarovsk players
FC Zvezda Irkutsk players
FC Luch Vladivostok players
Russian football managers
FC Okean Nakhodka managers
Association football midfielders